The Labour Party (PT) is a New Caledonian political party established on 18 November 2007. It is radically pro-independence and backed by the trade union  (USTKE). It is considered close to the French alterglobalization movement led by José Bové.

Elections

The PT supported two candidates in the 2007 French legislative election. Louis Kotra Uregei obtained 5.45% in New Caledonia's 1st constituency and François-Xavier Apock obtained 6.20% in New Caledonia's 2nd constituency.

In the latest legislative election of May 10, 2009, it won 7.97% of the vote and 3 seats in the Congress of New Caledonia. It won 11.97% in the North Province and 20.06% in the Loyalty Islands.

References

Labour parties
Melanesian socialism
Political parties established in 2007
Political parties in New Caledonia
Secessionist organizations
Separatism in France
Socialist parties in New Caledonia